Iwaruna klimeschi is a moth of the family Gelechiidae. It was described by Wolff in 1958. It is found in Austria, Italy, the Czech Republic, Slovakia, Hungary and Romania. Records for France refer to Iwaruna robineaui.

References

Moths described in 1958
Iwaruna